The Americas Zone was one of the three zones of the regional Davis Cup competition in 1998.

In the Americas Zone there were four different tiers, called groups, in which teams compete against each other to advance to the upper tier. Winners in Group II advanced to the Americas Zone Group I. Teams who lost their respective ties competed in the relegation play-offs, with winning teams remaining in Group II, whereas teams who lost their play-offs were relegated to the Americas Zone Group III in 1999.

Participating nations

Draw

 and  relegated to Group III in 1999.
 promoted to Group I in 1999.

First round

Venezuela vs. Guatemala

Haiti vs. Cuba

Peru vs. Jamaica

Uruguay vs. Paraguay

Second round

Haiti vs. Venezuela

Uruguay vs. Peru

Relegation play-offs

Cuba vs. Guatemala

Paraguay vs. Jamaica

Third round

Uruguay vs. Venezuela

References

External links
Davis Cup official website

Davis Cup Americas Zone
Americas Zone Group II